The Public Works and Public Service Workers Trade Union was a trade union in Trinidad and Tobago that merged with the National Union of Government Employees in 1959.

See also
 List of trade unions
 Federated Workers Trade Union
 National Union of Government and Federated Workers

References

Defunct trade unions of Trinidad and Tobago